Manohar Topno (born 25 June 1958) is an Indian field hockey player. He competed at the 1984 Summer Olympics in Los Angeles, where the Indian team placed fifth.

References

External links

Munda people
1958 births
Living people
Field hockey players from Jharkhand
Olympic field hockey players of India
Indian male field hockey players
Field hockey players at the 1984 Summer Olympics
Asian Games medalists in field hockey
Field hockey players at the 1982 Asian Games
Asian Games silver medalists for India
Medalists at the 1982 Asian Games